Coleophora ballotella is a moth of the family Coleophoridae. It is found from Germany, Poland and the Baltic States to the Iberian Peninsula, Italy and Greece. It has also been recorded from northern and southern Russia.

The larvae feed on Ballota nigra, Lamium amplexicaule, Leonurus, Marrubium peregrinum, Marrubium vulgare, Stachys officinalis and Teucrium chamaedrys. The rear end is strongly compressed laterally and curved downwards. The mouth angle is about 60°. Full-grown larvae can be found in June and July.

References

ballotella
Moths described in 1839
Moths of Europe
Taxa named by Josef Emanuel Fischer von Röslerstamm